Boulevard is the debut studio album by French DJ Ludovic Navarre, released under the stage name St Germain. It was released in the UK on July 28, 1995 and the USA on March 26, 2002. The album is more dance music-oriented and relaxing than his 2000 hit album Tourist.

In 2009 it was awarded a diamond certification from the Independent Music Companies Association which indicated sales of at least 250,000 copies throughout Europe.

Track listing

Original 1995 release 
 "Deep In It" – 7:20
 "Thank U Mum (4 Everything You Did)" – 12:34
 "Street Scene (4 Shazz)" – 15:46
 "Easy To Remember" – 9:40
 "Sentimental Mood" – 10:20
 "What's New" – 7:45
 "Dub Experience II" – 3:48
 "Forget It" – 7:57

American 2002 re-release 
 "Deep In It" – 7:20
 "Street Scene (4 Shazz)" – 15:46
 "Sentimental Mood" – 10:20
 "What's New" – 7:45
 "Dub Experience II" – 3:48
 "Forget It" – 7:57
 "Soul Salsa Soul" - 10:36
 "Alabama Blues (Todd Edwards vocal mix)" - 5:36

Personnel
Alexandre Destrez (Piano)
Pascal Ohsé (Trumpet)
Édouard Labor (Saxophone)
Malik (Flute)
Miguel "Punta" Rios (Percussion)
Ludovic Navarre (Writer, producer and sound engineer)

Certifications

References

External links
PopMatters Review

1995 debut albums
St. Germain (musician) albums